Oomsis is a village in Morobe Province of Papua-New Guinea.  It is located east of the valley of the Markham River along the Bulolo Highway Road.  It is 51.1 km from Lae, and 11.7 km from Gabensis.

External links
 Maplandia
 travelingluck

Populated places in Morobe Province